The 2012 German Darts Championship was the second of five PDC European Tour events on the 2012 PDC Pro Tour. The tournament took place at the Tempodrom in Berlin, Germany, from 22–24 June 2012. It featured a field of 64 players and £82,100 in prize money, with £15,000 for the winner.

Phil Taylor won the title, defeating Dave Chisnall 6–2 in the final. Colin Lloyd hit a nine-dart finish during his first round win over Alex Roy.

Prize money

Qualification
The top 32 players from the PDC Order of Merit automatically qualified for the event. The remaining 32 places went to players from three qualifying events - 20 from the UK Qualifier (held in Crawley on 25 May), eight from the European Qualifier (held in Cologne on 2 June), and four from the Host Nation Qualifier (held in Cologne on 1 June).

1–32

UK Qualifier
  Reece Robinson (second round)
  Alex Roy (first round)
  Keegan Brown (withdrew)
  Mick Todd (first round)
  Gaz Cousins (first round)
  Darren Johnson (first round)
  Mickey Mansell (third round)
  Peter Hudson (first round)
  Daniel Starkey (first round)
  William O'Connor (first round)
  Dave Ladley (second round)
  Jim Walker (first round)
  Steve Evans (first round)
  Andy Jenkins (first round)
  Darren Webster (first round)
  Michael Barnard (second round)
  Prakash Jiwa (first round)
  Sam Hill (first round)
  James Hubbard (third round)
  Dean Winstanley (second round)

European Qualifier
  Jerry Hendriks (first round)
  Mensur Suljović (second round)
  Kim Huybrechts (quarter-finals)
  Zdravko Antunović (first round)
  Magnus Caris (first round)
  Michael van Gerwen (first round)
  Leon de Geus (first round)
  Mareno Michels (first round)

Host Nation Qualifier
  Andree Welge (first round)
  Kevin Münch (first round)
  Bernd Roith (first round)
  Michael Rosenauer (second round)

Draw

References

German Darts Championship
2012 PDC European Tour
2012 in German sport
Sports competitions in Berlin